Pier Matteo Petrucci, C.O. (1636–1701) was a Roman Catholic cardinal.

Biography
Pier Matteo Petrucci was a priest and a philosophy professor. Together with Cardinal Alderano Cibo, he founded an institute for runaway children. In 1678, he became a superior of his Order. On 20 April 1681 he was consecrated bishop by Alderano Cibo, Cardinal-Bishop of Frascati in Jesi. Giacomo Altoviti, Titular Patriarch of Antiochia, and Odoardo Cibo, Titular Archbishop of Seleucia in Isauria were serving as co-consecrators. Pope Innocent XI made him a cardinal on 2 September 1686.

His works on mysticism and spirituality were criticized by the Jesuit Paolo Segneri. In 1688, the Inquisition banned his Quietistic writings about the passive resignation of the soul to God for being heretically mystical. Oddly enough, a treatise for women authored by the cardinal was still translated for English Protestants.

Petrucci participated at the conclaves of 1689 (election of Alexander VIII), 1691 (election of Innocent XII), and 1700 (election of Clement XI). He was Camerlengo of the Holy Roman Church in 1694–95.

Episcopal succession
While bishop, he was the principal consecrator of:

References

1636 births
1701 deaths
17th-century Italian cardinals
Oratorian bishops
People from Iesi
18th-century Italian cardinals